Atkinson is an unincorporated community in Atkinson Township, Carlton County, Minnesota, United States.

The community is located between Cloquet and Mahtowa at the intersection of Carlton County Road 61 and County Road 144.

Interstate 35 and State Highway 210 (MN 210) are nearby.  Atkinson is located 8 miles southwest of Cloquet.

Further reading
 Rand McNally Road Atlas - 2007 edition - Minnesota entry
 Official State of Minnesota Highway Map - 2011/2012 edition
 Mn/DOT map of Carlton County – 2012 edition

Unincorporated communities in Carlton County, Minnesota
Unincorporated communities in Minnesota